Agradigun ML High School, located in Agradigun, a small village bazar, is a school in the western part of Dhamoirhat Upazila in Naogaon District in the Division of Rajshahi, Bangladesh. Students from about twenty nearby villages are studying in this institution. Many of them have an indigenous background, and are underprivileged students in terms of education.

See also
 Agradigun
 Agradigun Union
 Al-Helal Islami Academy & College, Sapahar, Naogaon

References

 https://web.archive.org/web/20150714125826/http://www.socialbangla.com/school_collage/details.php?eid=22153 socialbangla.com (July 14, 2015)

High schools in Bangladesh
Schools in Naogaon District